1888 Newtown colonial by-election may refer to 

 1888 Newtown colonial by-election 1 held on 3 February 1888
 1888 Newtown colonial by-election 2 held on 25 February 1888

See also
 List of New South Wales state by-elections